The Dean Decker Site is an archeological site in Sweetwater and Fremont counties in Wyoming. The site extends for  along the terraces of Red Creek and Lower Sand Creek, with many Native American hearths and worked stone fragments. The site appears to have been used from the Middle Archaic Period to the Protohistoric Period. It was added to the National Register of Historic Places on March 12, 1986.

References

External links
 Dean Decker Site at the Wyoming State Historic Preservation Office

		
National Register of Historic Places in Sweetwater County, Wyoming
National Register of Historic Places in Fremont County, Wyoming
Archaeological sites on the National Register of Historic Places in Wyoming